Harutyun Chmshkyan was an Armenian politician who served as Minister of Justice
of the First Republic of Armenia in 1919.

References 

People of the First Republic of Armenia
Armenian Ministers of Justice